is a 2020 Japanese animated film and a sequel to High School Fleet (2016) and its 2017 original video animation (OVA). Produced by A-1 Pictures and distributed by Aniplex, the film is directed by Jun Nakagawa from a script written by Takaaki Suzuki and Kunihiko Okada, and features an ensemble cast that includes Shiina Natsukawa, Lynn, Nozomi Furuki, Atsumi Tanezaki, Yuuko Kurose, Yurika Kubo, Sora Amamiya, Naomi Ōzora, Minami Takahashi, Maria Naganawa, Tomori Kusunoki, Satomi Amano, Miyu Tomita, and Sayumi Suzushiro. Set three months after the events of the OVA, the film follows the crew of Harekaze II ship during a festival participated by various girls' maritime schools when a ship hijacking takes place.

An anime film based on the High School Fleet franchise was announced in April 2018. A-1 Pictures took over the animation production of the film from Production IMS in April 2019. In the same month, the cast and staff of the franchise's 2016 anime television series were announced to be returning for the film.

High School Fleet: The Movie premiered in Tokyo on January 12, 2020, and was released in Japan on January 18.

Plot
The ship crew of Harekaze II welcomes the students of Kure, Maizuru, and Sasebo maritime high schools for the upcoming inter-high tournament in Yokosuka. After visiting different stalls set up by their classmates for the welcome festival, Akeno Misaki and Mashiro Munetani befriend a foreigner named Susan Reyes. Later, Kaoru Furushou discusses with Akeno and Mashiro the recommendation of the crew of Hiei to promote Mashiro as their captain, causing uneasiness between each other. The following day, Blue Mermaids receives a report about the floating water purification plant and sea fortress being hijacked by pirates to set up their mobile sea base, while Susan infiltrates a massive float that is scheduled for scrapping to block the Blue Mermaids from leaving the city's harbor.

In a hospital, Susan admits to being coerced by the pirates in exchange for their help in looking for her father in Japan. Akeno, Mashiro, and Moeka China join the Blue Mermaids and other girls' maritime high schools in a mission to stop the two floating facilities from rendezvousing. Benten and Admiral Graf Spee successfully rescue the hostages of the plant and capture the pirates. Blue Mermaids and the high school fleet join the all-male White Dolphins in their assault on the fortress. As the fortress fires back, Akeno decides to infiltrate it due to Harekaze IIs size to fit through the small hole opened from the bombardment of the high school fleet's four Yamato-class flagships. With Susan's knowledge of the fortress' interior, Harekaze II successfully disables the fortress. After the mission, Mashiro tells Akeno her desire to stay with the crew to earn more experience while still aiming to become a captain.

Voice cast

Production
The official Twitter account of High School Fleet teased various projects and programs in the works in February 2017, but the staff did not specify their types. The franchise's official website announced the production of an anime film in April 2018. Production IMS, the franchise's animation studio, filed for bankruptcy with the Tokyo District Court in September 2018. Despite the studio's closure the following month, the production of the film was not yet canceled, with the franchise's official website remaining active. The film's title and logo were revealed in March 2019. In April 2019, A-1 Pictures was announced as the new animation studio for the film that was set to release the following year.

In April 2019, Jun Nakagawa was revealed to be directing the film with screenwriters Kunihiko Okada and Takaaki Suzuki, who was credited for the original concept, while Yuu Nobuta, director of the franchise's 2016 anime television series, returned as the chief director. In the same month, the cast of the anime series were revealed to be returning for the film. Additional cast for the film were announced in October 2019, including Minami Takahashi as Tōmi Miyazato, Maria Naganawa as Shia Nomura, Tomori Kusunoki as Azumi Abe, Satomi Amano as Tsubame Kawano, Miyu Tomita as Sachiho Chiba, and Sayumi Suzushiro as Keiko Nogiwa. Naomi Ōzora was also revealed as part of the cast to voice the new character Susan Reyes in December 2019.

Music
Shigeo Komori was announced to be composing High School Fleet: The Movie in April 2019, after previously doing so for High School Fleet (2016) and its two-episode original video animation released in 2017. In October 2019, TrySail was announced to be performing the theme music of the film titled "Free Turn".

Marketing
A trailer announcing the production of High School Fleet: The Movie was released in April 2018. A teaser key visual and trailer for the film were released in April 2019. The film received a new trailer in June 2019, followed by its second key visual in August. In October 2019, another trailer and the third key visual for the film were released. The final key visual and trailer for the film were released in December 2019.

The film was scheduled to hold a collaboration event with the dolphinarium Keikyu Aburatsubo Marine Park in October 2019, but it was later moved to December due to Typhoon Hagibis. Other promotional partners for the film included Yokohama Hakkeijima Sea Paradise, Aomi Coffee, Disk City Entertainment (DiCE) Internet cafe, and Lawson.

Release

Theatrical
High School Fleet: The Movie held its premiere at the United Cinemas Toyosu theater in Tokyo on January 12, 2020, and was released in 96 theaters in Japan on January 18. It was reported that the second part of the film had uncorrected parts from the original key animation due to tight deadlines following A-1 Pictures' take over. A new version of the film, with 400 cuts fixed, was released in 2D and 4DX on February 14, 2020.

Home media
High School Fleet: The Movie was released on Blu-ray and DVD in Japan on October 28, 2020. They include a special booklet supervised by Suzuki, the film's original soundtrack, and a newly-recorded drama CD. The film was broadcast in Japan on BS11 on January 1, 2022.

Reception
High School Fleet: The Movie grossed million at the Japanese box office. The film ranked tenth in its opening weekend, placing behind Made in Abyss: Dawn of the Deep Soul (2020).

Notes

References

External links
  
 
 

2020 anime films
4DX films
A-1 Pictures
Aniplex
Animated films based on animated series
Films set in Yokosuka
Japanese animated films
Japanese sequel films
Maritime incidents in fiction